is a Japanese actor, voice actor and narrator from Setagaya, Tokyo. He is the elder brother of fellow voice actor Hideyuki Hori and is currently represented by Aoni Production.

He is most known for the roles of Tokumaru Tatsumi (Saint Seiya), Dodoria, Android 19 (Dragon Ball Z), Gin (Detective Conan), and Robert McGuire (Crayon Shin-chan).

Filmography

Television animation
 Fist of the North Star (1984), Jadou
 Highschool! Kimengumi (1985), Danji Kai
 Saint Seiya (1986), Tokumaru Tatsumi
 Sakigake!! Otokojuku (1988), Gekkou, Student No.2
 Tsuide ni Tonchinkan (1988), Unba
 Soreike! Anpanman (1988), Amagumora (1st), Denkinamazuman, Hasamikuwagata, Toudaiman (2nd)
 Dragon Ball Z (1989), Android #19, Dodoria
 Dragon Ball Z: Bardock – The Father of Goku (1990 special), Dodoria
 Oniisama E... (1991), Physician (ep 29)
 Kinnikuman: Kinnikusei Oui Soudatsu-hen (1991), Neptuneman/The Samurai
 Dragon Quest: Dai no Daiboken (1991), Herohero
 Aoki Densetsu Shoot! (1993), Taichi Kawashima
 Mobile Suit Victory Gundam (1993), Goze Barl, Rasteo
 Nintama Rantaro (1993), Ikataro, Yuhta Imai
 Iron Leaguer (1993), GZ
 Marmalade Boy (1994), Reiji Tsuchiya (eps 64–76)
 Mobile Fighter G Gundam (1994), Carlos Andalusia
 Kuso Kagaku Sekai Gulliver Boy (1995), Eagle (eps 5–8)
 Detective Conan (1996), Gin
 Gegege no Kitarō (1996)
 Dragon Ball GT (1996), Android #19
 After War Gundam X (1996), Jenos Crisis, Romanov (eps 25–26, 28)
 Slayers Try (1997), Erulogos
 Manmaru the Ninja Penguin (1997), Gio
 Gasaraki (1998), Brigadier General Dole
 Crayon Shin-chan (1998), Robert McGuire
 Blue Gender (1999), Robert Bradley
 Inuyasha (2000), Tree of Human Faced Fruit (eps 57–58)
 S-CRY-ed (2001), Dread Red
 Final Fantasy: Unlimited (2001), Knave
 Mirage of Blaze (2002), Masamune Date, Shingen Takeda
 Kaleido Star (2003), Marine Park Owner
 Zoids: Fuzors (2003), Marvis
 GUNxSWORD (2005), Boat's captain (ep 7)
 Gintama (2006), Hayashi Ryuuzan
 Code Geass: Lelouch of the Rebellion (2006), Commanding Officer (ep 1)
 Yatterman (2008), Muscle Gatten (ep 51)
 Strike Witches (2008), Vice-captain (eps 2, 11)
 Dragon Ball Kai (2009), Cyborg #19
 Doraemon (2011), Dice Choboichi

Theatrical animation
 Tatakae!! Ramenman (1988), Soki
 Dragon Ball Z: Dead Zone (1989), Sansho
 Dragon Ball Z: Lord Slug (1991), Medamatcha
 Coo: Tooi Umi Kara Kita Coo (1993), Blackcap
 Dragon Ball Z: Fusion Reborn (1995), Captain Ginyu
 Case Closed: Countdown to Heaven (2001), Gin
 Blue Gender: The Warrior (2002), Robert
 Doraemon: Nobita and the Strange Wind Rider (2003), Wind Guide C
 Armored Trooper Votoms: Pailsen Files (2009)
 Detective Conan: The Raven Chaser (2009), Gin
 Detective Conan: The Darkest Nightmare (2016), Gin

Original video animation 
 Crying Freeman (1988), Yakuza B (ep 1)
 Saint Seiya: The Hades Chapter - Sanctuary (2002), Tokumaru Tatsumi
 Hijikata Toshizo: Shiro no Kiseki (2004), Kamo Serizawa

Video games 
 Cal III (1994), Poseidon
 AbalaBurn (1998), Bian, Pooly's teacher, Abyss/Avis
 Dynasty Warriors 2 (2000), Dong Zhuo, Lu Meng
 Grandia 2 (2000), Skye
 Metal Gear Solid (1998), Vulcan Raven
 Dynasty Warriors 3 (2001), Dong Zhuo, Lu Meng
 Dragon Ball Z: Budokai (2003), Android 19, Dodoria
 Dynasty Warriors 4 (2003), Dong Zhuo, Lu Meng
 Metal Gear Solid 3: Snake Eater (2004), The Sorrow
 Castlevania: Curse of Darkness (2005), Zead
 Dynasty Warriors 5 (2005), Dong Zhuo, Lu Meng
 JoJo's Bizarre Adventure: Phantom Blood (2006), Dire
 Dynasty Warriors 6 (2007), Dong Zhuo, Lu Meng
 Warriors Orochi (2007), Dong Zhuo, Lu Meng
 Warriors Orochi 2 (2008), Dong Zhuo, Lu Meng
 Ninja Gaiden Sigma 2 (2009), Marbu
 Dynasty Warriors 7 (2011), Dong Zhuo, Lu Meng
 Warriors Orochi 3 (2011), Dong Zhuo, Lu Meng
 Warriors: Legends of Troy (2011), Ajax
 Dynasty Warriors 8 (2013), Dong Zhuo, Lu Meng
 Digimon Story: Cyber Sleuth (2015), Craniamon
 Persona 5 (2016), Ichiryusai Madarame
 Kamen Rider: Battride War Genesis (2016), Kamen Rider ZX
 Digimon Story: Cyber Sleuth - Hacker's Memory (2017), Craniamon

 Television 
 Mirai Sentai Timeranger (2000), Narrator
 Tokusou Sentai Dekaranger (2004), Wojonian Jinche
 Ultraman Max (2005), Alien Zetton
 Kamen Rider Hibiki DVD (2005), Akane Taka, Kiaka Shishi
 Madan Senki Ryukendo (2006), Rock Crimson
 Juken Sentai Gekiranger (2007), Confrontation-Fist Hermit Crab Fist Dokariya

 Dubbing 2 Days in the Valley, Dosmo Pizzo (Danny Aiello)Breakdown, Earl (M. C. Gainey)Dynasty Warriors, Dong Zhuo (Lam Suet)Hulk, Glenn Talbot (Josh Lucas)The Nutty Professor'', Dean Richmond (Larry Miller)

References

External links
 Official agency profile 
 

1952 births
Living people
Aoni Production voice actors
Japanese male video game actors
Japanese male voice actors
Kokugakuin University alumni
Male voice actors from Setagaya
20th-century Japanese male actors
21st-century Japanese male actors